The following highways are numbered 32:

International
 Asian Highway 32
 European route E32

Australia
 Great Western Highway
 Barrier Highway
 East Derwent Highway
 Mitchell Highway

Canada
 Alberta Highway 32
 Manitoba Highway 32
 Northwest Arm Drive, also known as Nova Scotia Trunk 32
 Ontario Highway 32 (former)
 Saskatchewan Highway 32

Costa Rica
 National Route 32

Czech Republic
 I/32 Highway (Czech Republic); Czech: Silnice I/32

Hungary
 Main road 32 (Hungary)

Iceland
 Route 32 (Iceland)

India
  National Highway 32 (India)

Iran
 Road 32

Ireland
  N32 road (Ireland) (former)

Italy
 Autostrada A32

Japan
 Japan National Route 32
 Kōchi Expressway
 Tokushima Expressway

Korea, South
 Asan–Cheongju Expressway
 National Route 32
Gukjido 32

New Zealand
 New Zealand State Highway 32

Poland 
 National road 32 (Poland)

Thailand 

  Highway 32 (Thailand)

Turkey
  , a motorway in Turkey running from İzmir to Çeşme, İzmir Province.

United Kingdom
 British A32 (Alton-Gosport)
 British M32 (Hambrook-Bristol)

United States
 U.S. Route 32 (former)
 New England Route 32 (former)
 Alabama State Route 32
 Arkansas Highway 32
 California State Route 32
 County Route J32 (California)
 County Route S32 (California)
 Connecticut Route 32
 Delaware Route 32 (former)
 Florida State Road 32
 County Road 32 (Levy County, Florida)
 Georgia State Route 32
 Hawaii Route 32
 Idaho State Highway 32
 Illinois Route 32
 Indiana State Road 32
 Iowa Highway 32
 K-32 (Kansas highway)
 Kentucky Route 32
 Louisiana Highway 32 (former)
 Maine State Route 32
 Maryland Route 32
Maryland Route 32AA
Maryland Route 32AH
Maryland Route 32B
 Massachusetts Route 32
 M-32 (Michigan highway)
 Minnesota State Highway 32
 County Road 32 (Anoka County, Minnesota)
 County Road 32 (Dakota County, Minnesota)
 County Road 32 (Hennepin County, Minnesota)
 County Road 32 (Ramsey County, Minnesota)
 County Road 32 (St. Louis County, Minnesota)
 Mississippi Highway 32
 Missouri Route 32
 Nebraska Highway 32
 Nevada State Route 32 (former)
 New Hampshire Route 32
 New Jersey Route 32
 County Route 32 (Bergen County, New Jersey)
 County Route S32 (Bergen County, New Jersey)
 County Route 32 (Monmouth County, New Jersey)
 County Route 32 (Ocean County, New Jersey)
 New Mexico State Road 32
 New York State Route 32
 North Carolina Highway 32
 North Dakota Highway 32
 Ohio State Route 32
 Oklahoma State Highway 32
 Oregon Route 32 (former)
 Pennsylvania Route 32
 South Carolina Highway 32 (former)
 South Dakota Highway 32
 Tennessee State Route 32
 Texas State Highway 32 (proposed)
 Texas State Highway Spur 32 (former)
 Ranch to Market Road 32
 Texas Park Road 32
 Utah State Route 32
 Virginia State Route 32
 Virginia State Route 32 (1923-1933) (former)
 Virginia State Route 32 (1933-1940) (former)
 West Virginia Route 32
 Wisconsin Highway 32
 Wyoming Highway 32

Territories
 Guam Highway 32
 Puerto Rico Highway 32
 U.S. Virgin Islands Highway 32

See also
A32 (disambiguation)#Roads
List of highways numbered 32A
List of highways numbered 32B